Aleksandr Bulanov (born 26 December 1989) is a Russian athlete specialising in the shot put. He won the bronze medal at the 2015 Summer Universiade. Earlier in his career he won the silver at the 2008 World Junior Championships and gold at the 2007 European Junior Championships.

His personal bests in the event are 19.99 metres outdoors (Yerino 2015) and 19.92 metres indoors (Gothenburg 2013).

Doping ban
Bulanov tested positive for the anabolic steroid methandienone in an out-of-competition control in July 2009 and was subsequently handed a two-year ban from sports. The ban ended on 20 July 2011.

Competition record

References

1989 births
Living people
Doping cases in athletics
Russian male shot putters
Russian sportspeople in doping cases
Universiade medalists in athletics (track and field)
Place of birth missing (living people)
Universiade bronze medalists for Russia
Medalists at the 2015 Summer Universiade
21st-century Russian people